Manorbier railway station is in Pembrokeshire, Wales, on the Pembroke Dock branch of the West Wales Line is operated by Transport for Wales Rail, who also manage the station.

References

External links

Railway stations in Pembrokeshire
DfT Category F2 stations
Former Great Western Railway stations
Railway stations in Great Britain opened in 1863
Railway stations served by Great Western Railway
Railway stations served by Transport for Wales Rail
Grade II listed buildings in Pembrokeshire
Grade II listed railway stations in Wales